Challapalle is a village in Eluru district of the Indian state of Andhra Pradesh. It is administered under of Eluru revenue division.

Demographics 

 Census of India, Challapalle has population of 630 of which 302 are males while 328 are females.  Average Sex Ratio is 1086. Population of children with age 0-6 is 79 which makes up 12.54% of total population of village, Child sex ratio is 1026. Literacy rate of the village was 66.61%.

References

Villages in Eluru district